The following are the telephone codes in São Tomé and Príncipe.

Calling formats
 yyy xxxx      - Calls inside São Tomé and Príncipe
 +239 yyy xxxx - Calls from outside São Tomé and Príncipe
The NSN length is seven digits and there are no area codes.

Allocations

List of number ranges in São Tomé and Príncipe

References

Sao Tome and Principe
Telecommunications in São Tomé and Príncipe
São Tomé and Príncipe communications-related lists